Santiago Nicolás Viera Moreira (born 4 June 1998) is a Uruguayan footballer who plays as a midfielder for  Liverpool Montevideo in the Uruguayan Primera División.

Viera joined San Antonio on a season-long loan deal on January 15, 2020.

References

External links
National Team profile

1998 births
Living people
Uruguayan footballers
Uruguay under-20 international footballers
Uruguayan Primera División players
Liverpool F.C. (Montevideo) players
C.A. Cerro players
Association football midfielders
San Antonio FC players
Uruguayan expatriate footballers
Expatriate soccer players in the United States
Uruguayan expatriate sportspeople in the United States